Eudalaca hololeuca is a species of moth of the family Hepialidae. It is known from South Africa and Angola.

References

External links
Hepialidae genera

Moths described in 1910
Hepialidae
Moths of Africa
Insects of Angola